Platanichthys platana, the Rio Plata sprat, is a very small species of fish belonging to the herring family, Clupeidae.  It is endemic to South America.  It is the only species in its genus.

Environment
Platanichthys platana is recorded to be found in a freshwater environment within a pelagic depth range.  Although it is recorded to live in a freshwater environment, it lives in brackish water, which is defined as slightly salty water. This species is native to a subtropical climate.

Size
P. platana can reach the maximum recorded length of about 6.7 centimeters or about 2.63 inches as an unsexed male. The common length of this species is about 5 centimeters or about 1.96 inches.

Distribution
P. platana is recorded to occupy the areas of Rio de Janeiro, Brazi, Uruguay, and Argentina. They live more specifically in the areas of brackish waters of lagoons, estuaries, and the lower reaches of rivers.

References

Notes

Clupeidae
Taxa named by Charles Tate Regan
Fish of South America
Fish described in 1917
Monotypic fish genera
Monotypic freshwater fish genera
Monotypic ray-finned fish genera